Funter Bay Seaplane Base  is a state owned, public use seaplane base located in Funter Bay, in the Hoonah-Angoon Census Area of the U.S. state of Alaska. It is included in the National Plan of Integrated Airport Systems for 2015–2019, which categorized it as a general aviation airport based on 30 enplanements in 2012.

Facilities and aircraft
Funter Bay Seaplane Base has one seaplane landing area designated NE/SW with a water surface measuring 10,500 by 500 feet (3,200 x 152 m). For the 12-month period ending December 31, 2006, the airport had 150 aircraft operations, an average of 12 per month: 50% air taxi and 50% general aviation.

References

Other sources

 Essential Air Service documents (Docket DOT-OST-1997-3134) from the U.S. Department of Transportation:
 Order 2004-7-21 (July 22, 2004): re-selects Ward Air, Inc. to provide essential air service at Chatham and Funter Bay, Alaska, for the period December 1, 2003 through September 30, 2006, at an annual subsidy of $12,865.
 Order 2006-9-16 (September 18, 2006): re-selecting Ward Air, Inc., to continue to provide subsidized essential air service (EAS) at Chatham and Funter Bay, Alaska, and setting an annual subsidy rate of $15,040 for a new two-year term beginning October 1, 2006, through September 30, 2008. 
 Order 2008-6-27 (June 19, 2008): re-selecting Ward Air, Inc., to provide subsidized essential air service (EAS) at the communities of Chatham and Funter Bay, Alaska, for the two-year period beginning October 1, 2008, at an annual subsidy of $17,280 with 3-seat Cessna C-185, 4-seat Cessna C-206, or 6-seat DeHavilland DHC-2 Beaver single-engine, amphib-float equipped aircraft. 
 Order 2010-7-11 (July 15, 2010): re-selecting Ward Air, Inc., to provide essential air service (EAS) at Chatham and Funter Bay, Alaska, at annual subsidy rates of $6,311 at Chatham and $13,273 at Funter Bay, from October 1, 2010, through September 30, 2012.
 Order 2012-9-2 (September 4, 2012): re-selecting Ward Air, Inc., to provide Essential Air Service (EAS) at Chatham and Funter Bay, Alaska, at annual subsidies of $11,040 at Chatham and $12,896 at Funter Bay, from October 1, 2012, through September 30, 2013; and $11,472 at Chatham and $13,416 at Funter Bay, from October 1, 2013, through September 30, 2014.

External links
 Ward Air
 Topographic map from USGS The National Map

Airports in the Hoonah–Angoon Census Area, Alaska
Former Essential Air Service airports
Seaplane bases in Alaska